Carriss's Feed Store, located at KY 55 and KY 44 in Southville, Kentucky, was built in 1915.  It is a work of James W. Adams.  It has also been known as Southville Feed Store.  It was listed on the National Register of Historic Places in 1988.

References

Commercial buildings on the National Register of Historic Places in Kentucky
Commercial buildings completed in 1915
National Register of Historic Places in Shelby County, Kentucky
1915 establishments in Kentucky
Feed stores